Charles Phillips (born November 22, 1952) is a former American football safety.

Professional career
Phillips played in the National Football League (NFL) between 1975 and 1979.  In 1978, which was arguably his best season, he led the NFL in non-offensive touchdowns with 3, fumble return touchdowns with 2 and he also led the NFL in fumble return yards with 127 yards.  He recorded 19 interceptions in his career.

College career
He played college football at the University of Southern California and had an NCAA record 302 yards from interceptions in 1974.

References

1952 births
Living people
Sportspeople from Greenville, Mississippi
American football safeties
USC Trojans football players
USC Trojans baseball players
Oakland Raiders players
Players of American football from Mississippi